Cornelis "Kees" Alidanis Pijl (9 June 1897 – 3 September 1976) was a Dutch footballer who was active as a striker. Pijl played his whole career at Feyenoord and won eight caps for the Netherlands, scoring seven times, of which four against Romania at the 1924 Summer Olympics. After his career he managed Feyenoord from 1942 to 1946,

Honours
 1923-24 : Eredivisie winner with Feyenoord
 1927-28 : Eredivisie winner with Feyenoord
 1929-30 : KNVB Cup winner with Feyenoord

References

External links
 Profile

1897 births
1976 deaths
Dutch footballers
Netherlands international footballers
Dutch football managers
Feyenoord players
Feyenoord managers
Association football forwards
People from Oosterhout
Olympic footballers of the Netherlands
Footballers at the 1924 Summer Olympics
Footballers from North Brabant